The Royal Australian Naval Reserve (RANR) is the volunteer reserve force of the Royal Australian Navy in Australia.

The current Royal Australian Naval Reserve was formed in June 1973 by merging the former RANR (Seagoing) and the Royal Australian Naval Volunteer Reserve.

External links
 A brief history of the Royal Australian Naval Reserve, from 1863 to the present day  Accessed 9 April 2018.

Royal Australian Navy